The fall of Fallujah was a battle in the city of Fallujah in western Iraq that took place from late 2013 to early 2014, in which ISIL and other Sunni insurgents captured the city of Fallujah. It was one of the first Iraqi cities to fall out of the control of the Iraqi Government, and resulted in the Anbar campaign.

Battle 
On 30 December 2013, Iraqi forces dismantled a Sunni protest camp, which angered many people. Gunmen proceeded to attack deployed army patrols on the highway.

On 2 January 2014, Al-Qaeda seized control of parts of the town, as well as nearby Ramadi. After the army withdrew from the area ISIS fighters and its allies entered both cities. Many videos showed ISIS forces clashing with police forces, and ISIS attacks and seizures on the main police station. 100 inmates were freed, weapons and ammunition were seized, and most police forces abandoned their posts.

On January 3, the town was reportedly under the control of Sunni Rebels, but Iraq said the city remained contested. The rebels set police vehicles ablaze and brandished their weapons. The rebels raised their flag in Fallujah, took over all police stations, and military posts after security forces left the city.

On January 4, the town was taken by Sunni Rebels and Al-Qaeda fighters. The Iraqi army shelled the city with mortars in an attempt to wrestle back the town, but resulted in the deaths of 8 people and wounded 30. 60% of the town was reported to be under rebel control. Much later, Prime Minister Nouri al-Maliki vowed to eliminate "all terrorist groups" in a statement on national television. The police chief of the Anbar said that Iraqi forces were in control of the outskirts of Fallujah, but the city itself was held by ISIS and its allies. Sunni tribesmen refused to let Iraqi forces into the city, but held negotiations with them. Iraqi forces proceeded to shell the city from a nearby military base, before eventually withdrawing.

Aftermath 

Four months later, the War in Iraq of 2013 to 2017 escalated. Two years later, Iraqi Government recaptured the city.

See also 

 Fall of Mosul
 Second Battle of Tikrit
 Anbar campaign (2015–2016)
 Battle of Ramadi (2014–2015)
 Battle of Ramadi (2015–2016)
 List of wars and battles involving ISIL

References 

Conflicts in 2013
Conflicts in 2014
Military operations of the Iraqi Civil War in 2014
Military operations of the War in Iraq (2013–2017) involving the Islamic State of Iraq and the Levant
Military operations of the War in Iraq (2013–2017) involving the al-Nusra Front
December 2013 events in Iraq
January 2014 events in Iraq
Battles in 2013
Fallujah, Fall of